Contradiction is the eighth studio album by The Ohio Players, and the fourth album recorded for Mercury.

History
Contradiction was not as ballad-heavy as Honey, but it did expand on the mixture of funk, soul, and rock that they played with on that album.  The title track also showed a leaning towards the work they did on Westbound.  "Who'd She Coo?" was released as a single and went to No. 1 on the Billboard R&B chart.

The band recorded Contradiction at three different recording studios, each session utilizing Barry Mraz as their engineer. The album cover depicts a nude woman feeding a horse a shiny red apple.  While the horse is identified by name and breed in the liner notes (an Anglo-Trakehner stallion named Wasyl), the model is uncredited.

It is the fifth and last Ohio Players album to be announced also as a quadraphonic (four-channel stereo) release in the 8-track tape format.  However, it was never actually released as no known copies have surfaced even among collectors, and there is no evidence the remix was ever performed.  Contradiction was one of three Ohio Players albums released in 1976.  Westbound released Rattlesnake, featuring songs not used during their time with the label.  With four Mercury albums under their belt and hit singles on the charts, the group would approve a greatest hits compilation, Gold.

Track listing

Personnel
Billy Beck – grand piano, Fender Rhodes piano, Wurlitzer electric piano, Hohner Clavinet, RMI Electric Piano, ARP "Odyssey" Synthesizer, ARP String Ensemble, percussion, vocals
James "Diamond" Williams – drums, timbales, congas, cowbells, steel drums, temple blocks, percussion, vocals
Marshall "Rock" Jones – electric bass, percussion
Marvin "Merv" Pierce – trumpets, trombones, percussion
Ralph "Pee Wee" Middlebrooks – trumpets
Clarence "Satch" Satchell – flute, alto saxophone, tenor saxophone, percussion, vocals
Leroy "Sugarfoot" Bonner – guitars, harmonica, percussion, vocals

Production
Ohio Players – producers
Barry Mraz, Lee Hulko – engineers
Rob Kingsland, Karl Richardson, Steve Klein, Hank Neuberger – assistant engineer
Jim Ladwig – art director
Joe Kotleba, Jim Schubert – design
Paul Gremmler – cover photography
David Alexander – Ohio Players photos

Charts

Singles

See also
List of number-one R&B albums of 1976 (U.S.)

References

External links
 Contradiction at Discogs

1976 albums
Ohio Players albums
Mercury Records albums